David Horowitz (1903–2002)  was the founder of the educational research organization United Israel World Union and one of eight children of Cantor Aaron and Bertha Horowitz whose family immigrated to the United States in 1914. He first went to the land of present-day Israel in 1924 as an ardent Zionist. He married and moved to Poland in 1927 where he lived with his wife's parents during her pregnancy and played a part in trying to rescue European Jews from the Nazi plan to eliminate them as Germany conquered the countries of Europe during the 1939-1945 Second World War. He moved to the U.S. in 1943 where he became an accredited correspondent to the United Nations and founded the United Israel World Union. The purpose of his organization was to preach a universal Hebraic faith for all humankind based on the Decalogue and the other universal commandments of the Torah. The hallmark of the organization was Isaiah's prescription that:
My house will become a house of prayer for all peoples ...
This is the same verse that Herbert W. Armstrong used for his reason to build the Ambassador Auditorium in Pasadena, California, and Armstrong once announced a plan to assist in the building of a Jewish/Christian/Islamic center at Mount Sinai with the blessings of both Egyptian and Israeli leaders.

Horowitz authored State in the Making (1953, Knopf, NY), recounting his contributions to the creation of the State of Israel. He was also the long-time editor of the United Nations Correspondents Association's quarterly newsletter and was the author of the 1986 biography "Pastor Charles Taze Russell: An Early American Christian Zionist."  The book detailed the pro-Zionism writings and sermons of the founder of the Watch Tower Bible and Tract Society, better known as the Jehovah's Witness movement.

Notably, Horowitz also wrote Thirty-Three Candles, an autobiographical book detailing his involvement with Messianic claimant Moses Guibbory and famed radio announcer Boake Carter.

In 2019, Ralph E. Buntyn, a close associate for 10 years and Vice President of the United Israel World Union, wrote a biography of Horowitz, 'The Book of David ; David Horowitz: Dean of United Nations Press Corps and Founder: United Israel World Union

See also 
 Ten Lost Tribes

References

1903 births
2002 deaths
American Zionists
Jewish American writers
20th-century American Jews
21st-century American Jews